Robert Newell (1835–1858) was a British Army recipient of the Victoria Cross.

Robert Newell may also refer to:

Robert Newell (politician) (1807–1869), politician in Oregon, United States
Robert Henry Newell (1836–1901), American humorist
Robert Newell (priest) (died 1642), English Anglican priest